Gao Xinglong (born 12 March 1994) is a Chinese male track and field athlete who competes in the long jump.

Born in Heilongjiang, Gao began to establish himself at elite level with a jump of  indoors in Nanjing in March 2013. Outdoors, he won at the inaugural Friendship Meeting international between China, Japan and Korea.

He improved further outdoors, clearing  at a national level meeting in Jinhua – a mark which ranked him in the top 15 globally for the season and Asia's second best man after compatriot Li Jinzhe. In his first major competition he won a bronze medal at the 2014 Asian Games, beaten by Li and Korean Kim Deok-hyeon. He ended the season with his first national title win at the Chinese Athletics Championships.

Gao continued to improve into the 2015 season. His first continental title followed at the 2015 Asian Athletics Championships, where he jumped under eight metres but still saw off all competition on home turf in Wuhan.

International competitions

References

External links

Living people
1994 births
Athletes from Heilongjiang
Chinese male long jumpers
World Athletics Championships athletes for China
Asian Games bronze medalists for China
Athletes (track and field) at the 2016 Summer Olympics
Olympic athletes of China
Medalists at the 2014 Asian Games
Asian Games medalists in athletics (track and field)
Athletes (track and field) at the 2014 Asian Games
Athletes (track and field) at the 2020 Summer Olympics
21st-century Chinese people